Ramulispora sorghi is a plant pathogen infecting sorghum.

References

External links 
 Index Fungorum
 USDA ARS Fungal Database

Brady, C.R., Noll, L.W., Saleh, A.A., and Little, C.R. 2011. Disease severity and microsclerotium properties of the sorghum sooty stripe pathogen, Ramulispora sorghi. Plant Disease 95: 853–859. 

Fungal plant pathogens and diseases
Sorghum diseases
Hyaloscyphaceae